Tinker Creek is a stream in Union County, South Carolina, in the United States.

Tinker Creek, originally called Tinkle Creek, was named for the sound of running water, according to local history.

References

Rivers of Union County, South Carolina
Rivers of South Carolina